Daria Kaleniuk is a Ukrainian civil society activist who is the executive director of the Anti-Corruption Action Center, based in Kyiv. During the 2022 Russian invasion of Ukraine, Kaleniuk came to international media prominence when she asked British prime minister Boris Johnson at a press conference in Warsaw why some London-based Russian oligarchs had not been targeted with sanctions and why he did not support the establishment of a no-fly zone over Ukraine.

Kaleniuk was born in Zhytomyr, Ukraine and studied law at the Yaroslav Mudryi National Law University and has a Master of Financial Services Law from Chicago-Kent College of Law, supported by the Fulbright Foreign Student Program. She is a member of the Young Global Leaders.

References

Living people
People from Zhytomyr
Year of birth missing (living people)
Ukrainian women activists
Yaroslav Mudryi National Law University alumni
Chicago-Kent College of Law alumni
Ukrainian anti-corruption activists